Francis Patrick Donoghue (17 August 1904 – 31 May 1971) was an Australian rules footballer who played with Carlton in the Victorian Football League (VFL).

Family
The son of Patrick Donoghue (1871-1946), and Mary Elizabeth Donoghue (1878-1952), née Deery,  Francis Patrick Donoghue as born at Bairnsdale, Victoria on 17 August 1904.

He married Jessica Beatrice Mills (1908-2000) in 1933. he married Mary Elizabeth Fitzpatrick in 1954.

Education
He was educated at Nambrok State School No.3626, Sale High School, and Xavier College. 

As a resident of Newman College he studied medicine at the University of Melbourne, graduating Bachelor of Medicine and Bachelor of Surgery (M.B.B.S.) on 17 September 1928.

Football
Recruited from University Blues, and cleared from the Rosedale Football Club in Gippsland, he played in 51 games for the Carlton First XVIII over four seasons (1925-1928).

On Saturday, 31 July 1926 he played for a representative VFL side in a match against a combined Ovens and Murray League team.

Medical practice
In mid-1936 he took over the practice of the recently deceased Horace Pern (1872-1936), M.R.C.S. (Eng.), L.R.C.P. (Lond.), in Leongatha, Victoria.

Military service
He served in the Australian Army Medical Corps in the Second World War.

Death
He died at the Repatriation General Hospital, in Heidelberg, Victoria on 31 May 1971.

Notes

References
 
 World War Two Nominal Roll: Major Francis Patrick Donoghue (VX104270), Department of Veterans' Affairs.
 World War Two Service Record: Major Francis Patrick Donoghue (VX104270), National Archives of Australia.
 School Sports: Gippsland Schools' Meeting, The Weekly Times. (Saturday, 23 October 1920), p.24.
 More People who live at Leongatha, The Weekly Times, (Wednesday, 4 October 1950), p.20.
 O'Brien, Jack, "The Princess is his Best Patient", The Argus, (Monday, 30 July 1956), p.15.

External links 
 
 
 Frank Donoghue's profile at Blueseum.
 Frank Donoghue at Boyles Football Photos.

1904 births
1971 deaths
People educated at Xavier College
Melbourne Medical School alumni
Australian rules footballers from Victoria (Australia)
University Blues Football Club players
Carlton Football Club players
Australian Army personnel of World War II